MasterChef is a competitive cooking show television format created by Franc Roddam, which originated with the UK version in July 1990. The format was revived and updated for the BBC in February 2005 by executive producers Roddam and John Silver with series producer Karen Ross.

The revived format is sold internationally by Banijay. Its first international adaptation was MasterChef Australia, which began in 2009. The show has since been adapted in several other countries.

Format
The show's format has been exported around the world under the same MasterChef logo, and is now produced in more than 40 countries and airs in over 200 territories.

The format has appeared most often in four major versions: the main MasterChef series, MasterChef: The Professionals for professional working chefs, Celebrity MasterChef featuring well known celebrities as the contestants, and Junior MasterChef, a version created and adapted for children, which was first developed in 1994 and has also expanded to other countries in recent years.

Despite the four major versions, in 2012, Australia created the fifth version called MasterChef All-Stars, for former contestants to raise money for charity. In 2018, Ukraine created MasterChef Teens, for teenage contestants. In 2019, Brazil created MasterChef: Para Tudo (MasterChef: Stop Everything), a TV show featuring interviews with judges and former contestants, plus recipes and memes, presented by Ana Paula Padrão. In Brazil, MasterChef All-Stars was titled MasterChef: A Revanche (MasterChef: The Rematch), being released in 2019 and featuring former contestants who did not win the competition before. In 2022, Brazil created MasterChef +, for seniors over 60 years old contestants.
The Masterchef franchise is popular with audiences all over the world. 
MasterChef Australia is the most watched television series in Australia, with the season 2 finale being the third most watched show in Australian television history. MasterChef Australia also won the award for 'Most Popular Reality Program' at the 2010 Logie Awards. Many other countries also broadcast the Australian version, either dubbed or with subtitles in the local language.

In 2018 mobile game developer Animoca secured the licence to MasterChef to make games based on the hit reality television series.

International versions
Current, previous and upcoming versions include:
 Currently airing franchise
 Franchise no longer in production

Mobile game (MasterChef: Dream Plate) 
MasterChef: Dream Plate allows players to play as a MasterChef TV show contestant who cooks and presents dishes in competition with other contestants, using challenging ingredients and recipes. The dishes are judged by fellow players in real-time.

See also
 Junior MasterChef
 MasterChef: The Professionals
 Plate of Origin
 The World Master Chefs Society

References

 
Endemol Shine Group franchises
Cooking competitions in the United Kingdom
Reality television series franchises
Reality competition television series